According to Hindu scriptures, Aśvattha, or Sacred fig (Ficus religiosa), is a sacred tree for the Hindus and has been extensively mentioned in texts pertaining to Hinduism, for example as peepul in Rig Veda mantra I.164.20. In Buddhism, the Bodhi Tree under which Gautama Buddha gained enlightenment is also of the same species.

Adi Shankara derives it from shva (tomorrow) and stha (that which remains). Ashva (horse) and stha (situated), meaning where horses are tied, is another derivation.

Yama, while instructing Naciketa describes the eternal Asvattha tree with its root upwards, and branches downwards, which is the pure immortal Brahman, in which all these worlds are situated, and beyond which there is nothing else (Katha Upanishad Verse II.iii.1). Meanwhile, Krishna tells us that the Asvattha tree having neither end nor beginning nor stationariness whatsoever has its roots upwards and branches downwards whose branches are nourished by the Gunas and whose infinite roots spread in the form of action in the human world which though strong are to be cut off by the forceful weapon of detachment to seek the celestial abode from which there is no return (Bhagavad Gita XV.1-4). The former teaches that the Asvattha tree is real being identical with Brahman and therefore impossible to cut-off; the latter insists that the Asvattha tree must be regarded as unreal being identical with existence which needs to be cut-off. 

The fire sticks used in Hindu sacrificial fire like agnihotra also contain dried wood of ashvatha tree.

See also

 World tree

References

Dictionary of Hindu Lore and Legend by Anna Dallapiccola

Individual trees
Trees in mythology

Trees in Buddhism
Sacred trees in Hinduism